Msx2-interacting protein is a protein that in humans is encoded by the SPEN gene.

This gene encodes a hormone inducible transcriptional repressor. Repression of transcription by this gene product can occur through interactions with other repressors, by the recruitment of proteins involved in histone deacetylation, or through sequestration of transcriptional activators. The product of this gene contains a carboxy-terminal domain that permits binding to other corepressor proteins. This domain also permits interaction with members of the NuRD complex, a nucleosome remodeling protein complex that contains deacetylase activity. In addition, this repressor contains several RNA recognition motifs that confer binding to a steroid receptor RNA coactivator; this binding can modulate the activity of both liganded and nonliganded steroid receptors.

Interactions
SPEN has been shown to interact with HDAC1, SRA1 and Nuclear receptor co-repressor 2.

References

Further reading